Duncan Cooper (1880–?) was an English footballer who played at left-back for Witton Albion and Burslem Port Vale in the early 1900s.

Career
Cooper played for Witton Albion before joining Burslem Port Vale in November 1901. His debut came at the Athletic Ground in a 1–1 draw with Stockport County on 14 December. He was unable to gain a regular place however, and after playing only four more Second Division games in the 1901–02 season he was released at the end of the 1902–03 season.

Career statistics
Source:

References

1880 births
Year of death missing
People from Middlewich
English footballers
Association football fullbacks
Witton Albion F.C. players
Port Vale F.C. players
English Football League players